"The Sons of Katie Elder" is the theme song for the 1965 Paramount western of the same name starring John Wayne. It was written by Ernie Sheldon (words) and Elmer Bernstein (music).

The song, as recorded by Johnny Cash, wasn't used in the actual film, but appeared on its soundtrack LP. Released as a single by Columbia Records (Columbia 4-43342, with "A Certain Kinda Hurtin'" on the opposite side), in July 1965, the song became a U.S. country top-10 hit.

Background 
According to the book Johnny Cash FAQ: All That's Left to Know About the Man in Black, the song used "virtually the same music and arrangement" as a song titled "Thunderball" that Johnny Cash had recorded as a potential title song for the James Bond movie of the same name during the sessions for the double album Johnny Cash Sings the Ballads of the True West. Cash's version of the song was rejected in favor of Tom Jones' one, and

The book The Man in Song: A Discographic Biography of Johnny Cash tells a slightly different story:

Track listing

Charts

Personnel 
Cash recorded the song on June 11, 1965, at the  Columbia Studio in Nashville, Tessessee.

 Johnny Cash – vocals, guitar
 The Statler Brothers: Lew DeWitt, Don Reid, Harold Reid, Phil Balsley; The Carter Family: Maybelle, Anita, Helen, June – vocal harmonies
 Luther Perkins – electric guitar
 Marshall Grant – bass guitar
 W.S. 'Fluke' Holland – drums
 Unknown – French horns
 Unknown – timpani
 Bill McElhiney – Arranger & Conductor
 Don Law and Frank Jones – Producers

References

External links 
 "The Sons of Katie Elder" on the Johnny Cash official website

Johnny Cash songs
1965 singles
Columbia Records singles
1965 songs
Songs with music by Elmer Bernstein
Songs about fictional male characters
Songs about cowboys and cowgirls
American country music songs
Song recordings produced by Don Law